The 2025 BWF World Championships is a badminton tournament which will be held in Paris, France.

Host city selection
Paris was awarded the event in November 2018 during the announcement of 18 major badminton event hosts from 2019 to 2025.

References

BWF World Championships
International sports competitions hosted by France
Badminton tournaments in France
Sport in Paris
BWF World Championships
BWF World
Badminton World Championships